Like Rabid Dogs is a 1976 Italian crime-thriller film written and directed by Mario Imperoli. It is loosely inspired by the Circeo Massacre, in which three young men abducted, and then raped and tortured, two young women over a two-day period.

Plot 
Tony is the young member of an upper class Roman family; he lives a hectic double life, and under the guise of good student, he likes to persecute and kill prostitutes in the company of a couple of friends.

Cast 

 Jean-Pierre Sabagh as Inspector Muzzi
 Cesare Barro as  Tony
 Paola Senatore as  Germana
 Annarita Grapputo as  Silvia
 Paolo Carlini as  Arrigo Ardenghi
 Luis La Torre as  Rico
 Gloria Piedimonte as  Kidnapped girl

References

External links

1970s Italian-language films
Poliziotteschi films
1970s crime thriller films
Films directed by Mario Imperoli
Films set in Rome
1970s Italian films